Wolf's Clothing may refer to:
 Wolf's Clothing (1936 film), a British comedy film
 Wolf's Clothing (1927 film), an American comedy film
 Wolf's Clothing (play), a 1958 comedy play by Kenneth Horne